Kavalar is a rural locality (a selo) in Kilersky Selsoviet, Dokuzparinsky District, Republic of Dagestan, Russia. The population was 129 as of 2010. There are 2 streets.

Geography 
Kavalar is located 3 km south of Usukhchay (the district's administrative centre) by road. Demirar and Chuvalar are the nearest rural localities.

Nationalities 
Lezgins live there.

References 

Rural localities in Dokuzparinsky District